The 1970 Northwestern Wildcats team represented Northwestern University during the 1970 Big Ten Conference football season. In their seventh year under head coach Alex Agase, the Wildcats compiled a 6–4 record (6–1 against Big Ten Conference opponents) and finished in a tie for second place in the Big Ten.

The team's offensive leaders were quarterback Maurie Daigneau with 1,228 passing yards, Mike Adamle with 1,255 rushing yards, and Barry Pearson with 552 receiving yards. Eight Northwestern players received honors on the 1970 All-Big Ten Conference football team.  They are: (1) halfback Mike Adamle (AP-1, UPI-1); (2) flanker Barry Pearson (AP-1); (3) tackle John Rodman (AP-1, UPI-2); (4) guard Mike Sikich (AP-1, UPI-1); (5) center John Zigulich (UPI-1); (6) defensive tackle Jim Anderson (AP-2); (7) defensive back Eric Hutchinson (AP-1, UPI-1); and (8) defensive back Rick Telander (AP-2).

Schedule

Roster

Team players in the NFL

References

Northwestern
Northwestern Wildcats football seasons
Northwestern Wildcats football